Government Degree College Kokernag is a college in Kokernag town and famous tourist resort of Anantnag in  Jammu and Kashmir. It is affiliated to the University of Kashmir in Srinagar and was recently accessed by NAAC, Bangalore for Assessment and Accreditation and was accredited with by the same University Grants Commission agency. It is a co-educational college, founded in 2008. During the initial years the college functioned in dilapidated huts in the premises of the Higher Secondary School, Kokernag. Now the college has been shifted to Irkumu, Kokernag, which is about two kilometres from the main township and has a lush green campus with snow-clad mountains in the background. It now has a suitable infrastructure which satisfies the basic demands of students. As of year 2019, the college has about 1,800 students on roll and about 55 teaching and non-teaching staff to cater the students.

The college offers following bachelor's degree courses:
 Bachelor of Arts (BA)
 Bachelor of Science (BSc)
The college was allowed to offer the Bachelor of Science program from the year 2017. In addition to the regular courses offered, the college got IGNOU membership in the year 2018 to run the non-regular or distance courses in future.

See also
 Kokernag Tourism
 Rehmat-E-Alam College Of Education Anchidora Anantnag
 Jamia College Of Education Brakpora Anantnag (JCE)
 Anantnag

References

Universities and colleges in Jammu and Kashmir
University of Kashmir
2008 establishments in Jammu and Kashmir
Educational institutions established in 2008
Colleges affiliated to University of Kashmir